Adam Nicolson (born August 13, 1984) is a former wide receiver in the CFL. He wears the number 84, weighs 219 lbs. and is 6'4 tall. Nicolson attended the University of Ottawa and played for the Ottawa Gee-Gees. From 2004 to 2006, he played in 19 games, in which Nicolson had 88 catches for 1572 yards. He also scored 12 touchdowns. In his playoff career, Nicolson averaged 69 receiving yards per game. During the 2006 Mitchell Bowl, he had 6 catches for 109 yards and a touchdown versus the Saskatchewan Huskies. The Gee-Gees would lose the game, though. Nicolson was selected by the Lions in the first round (eighth overall) in the 2007 CFL Draft.

References

External links
Just Sports Stats

1984 births
Living people
BC Lions players
Players of Canadian football from Ontario
Canadian football wide receivers
Ottawa Gee-Gees football players
Sportspeople from North Bay, Ontario